Strength is the second studio album by the American rock band Enuff Z'nuff, released in 1991. The band had positive momentum at the time of the album's release, including an appearance on the Late Show with David Letterman, as well as Rolling Stone calling them "The Hot Band of 1991." Although Strength quickly entered the British charts at No. 56, the album peaked at only No. 143 in the United States.

In 2007, lead singer and guitarist of Enuff Z'nuff, Donnie Vie, released the album Extra Strength, an acoustic reworking of the 1991 recording. Strength was re-issued June 2011 in Japan on the SHM-CD format.

Critical reception

The Encyclopedia of Popular Music called the album "an impressive and mature musical offering that combined infectious hooks, abrasive guitar work and a sparkling production to dramatic effect." The Washington Post wrote that it "is actually quite likable, with a melodic flair that renders such songs as 'Heaven or Hell' and 'Blue Island' as agreeable as, say, middling Badfinger." The Province thought that "as the hair drops and the lip gloss is wiped away, Enuff Z'Nuff slowly is letting its real personality show - a group that really wants to be the hard rock equivalent of The Beatles or, failing that, the glam-rock Cheap Trick or, at least, the bastard children of Slade and The Raspberries."

Track listing
Credits adapted from the original release.

Personnel
Enuff Z'nuff
Donnie Vie – lead vocals, guitars, keyboards, piano, producer
Derek Frigo – lead guitar
Chip Z'Nuff – bass guitars, guitars, vocals, producer
Vikki Foxx – drums

Additional musicians
Johnny Frigo – violin and viola (tracks 3 & 7)
Dennis Karmazyn – cello (tracks 3 & 7)
Paul Lani – mellotron (tracks 3 & 12)

Production
Paul Lani – producer, mixing at The Hit Factory, New York City
Lawrence Ethan, Steve Heinke – engineers
Bruce Brekenfeld, John Armstrong – additional engineering
Andy Grassi, Carl Glanville, Dave Mauragas – assistant engineers
Bob Ludwig – mastering at Masterdisk, New York City
Bob Defrin – art direction

References

External links
Heavy Harmonies page

Enuff Z'nuff albums
1991 albums
Atco Records albums
Albums produced by Paul Lani